During the 2005–06 English football season, Southampton Football Club competed in the Football League Championship after relegation from the premier league the previous season.

Southampton endured a poor to largely indifferent season after relegation from the Premier League the previous season and finished in a lowly 12th place in the Championship. Although the south coast side started the season well, they ended up drawing too many games (19 games by the season's end) and a run of five wins from 35 games dragged them into the lower reaches of the table and put Southampton in danger of a second successive relegation. Manager Harry Redknapp, unable to establish consistency and unhappy with the appointment of former rugby coach Sir Clive Woodward to the coaching staff, had resigned in December, returning as manager of Southampton's archrivals Portsmouth. His replacement, former Ipswich Town manager George Burley, was unable to turn the club's form around until the back end of the season, with five wins from their last six games taking the team from 20th to 12th. The late run of form gave fans hope that next season Southampton could mount a sustained attempt at promotion.

Kit
The season's kit was manufactured by the club's own brand, Saints. The kit was sponsored by English life insurance company Friends Provident.

Final league table

Results
Southampton's score comes first

Legend

Championship

FA Cup

League Cup

First-team squad
Squad at end of season

Left club during season

Reserve squad

Transfers In

Transfers Out

References

Southampton F.C. seasons
Southampton